Ridgewood Savings Bank is the largest mutual savings bank in New York State and was founded in 1921. It operates 35 branches across New York City's five boroughs, Long Island and Westchester County.

History

The bank was chartered as Savings Bank of Ridgewood on June 18, 1921. It began when 14 local businessmen in Ridgewood, Queens decided to form a mutual savings bank to serve the needs of the community. The Bank's first headquarters was a converted Taproom located at the intersection of Myrtle and Forest Avenues. In 1929, the cornerstone was laid for a new headquarters at the same site and the name was changed from Savings Bank of Ridgewood to Ridgewood Savings Bank. The building architects were Halsey, McCormack and Helmer, Inc. and the general contractors were Stamarith Construction Corporation. In 1940, the bank opened its first branch office, in Forest Hills, Queens. The building is located at the intersection of Queens Boulevard and 108th Street, and was designated a New York City Landmark in 2000 by the New York City Landmarks Preservation Commission. In 2007, City and Suburban Bank joined Ridgewood Savings, increasing the number of branches by 12.

List of presidents

Rudolph Stutzmann, 1921–1946
Herman Ringe, 1946–1948
Walter J. Hess, 1948–1971
William A. McKenna Jr., 1992–2003
William C. McGarry, 2004–2012
Peter M. Boger, 2012–2018
Leonard Stekol, 2018–present

References

External links 
 Official Site

Companies based in New York (state)
Banks established in 1921
Mutual savings banks in the United States
Banks based in New York City
Landmarks Preservation Commission
1921 establishments in New York City
Ridgewood, Queens